Phil Cokanasiga (born 31 July 2001) is a professional rugby union player for Leicester Tigers in Premiership Rugby, his preferred position is centre. He previously played for London Irish.

Career
In 2019 Cokanasiga played for England under 18s. He made his debut for London Irish in the 2019-20 season, and played for Rosslyn Park, and Esher, on loan during the 2021-22 season.

On 12 May 2022 it was announced Cokanasiga had signed for Leicester Tigers. He made his Leicester debut on 10 September 2022 as a replacement in a 24-20 defeat away to Exeter Chiefs.

References

2001 births
Living people
English rugby union players
Leicester Tigers players
London Irish players
Rosslyn Park F.C. players
Rugby union centres
Rugby union players from London
Sportspeople from Suva